NH 31 may refer to:

 National Highway 31 (India)
 New Hampshire Route 31, United States